Even Skaarer is a Norwegian sport shooter who has won the IPSC Norwegian Handgun Championship nine times and the IPSC Norwegian Rifle Championship four times.

References 
 DSSN Hall of Fame
 TriggerFreeze.com - IPSC Rifle Norway

IPSC shooters
Norwegian male sport shooters
Living people
Year of birth missing (living people)
Place of birth missing (living people)